Oh Kyu-bin (born 4 September 1992) is a South Korean professional footballer

Club career
Oh played football for both his high school, Jeonju Technical High School and also for the Kwandong University, before joining Seoul E-Land FC. He was loaned to national league side Gyeongju HNP in 2015, although he did not make an appearance.

He then joined K League Challenge side Chungju Hummel FC, where he amassed 21 appearances, scoring once.

In 2017, Oh joined Malaysian side Perlis FA.

Career statistics

Club

Notes

References

External links
 

1992 births
Living people
Association football midfielders
South Korean footballers
South Korean expatriate footballers
Expatriate footballers in Malaysia
South Korean expatriate sportspeople in Malaysia
Chungju Hummel FC players
Perlis FA players
K League 2 players